Daniele is an Italian surname. Notable people with the surname include:

Eleonora Daniele (born 1976), Italian actress and television presenter
Gaetano Daniele, Italian film producer
Graciela Daniele (born 1939), American dancer, choreographer and theatre director
Guido Daniele (born 1950), Italian artist
Mario Daniele (born 1961), Argentine politician
Pino Daniele (1955–2015), Italian singer-songwriter and guitarist
Romina Daniele (born 1980), Italian singer and composer
Stephen Daniele, role-playing game artist

Italian-language surnames